Arizona (SSN-803), a Block V , will be the fourth United States Navy vessel named for the state of Arizona, and the first vessel to carry the name since the loss of the  during the attack on Pearl Harbor on 7 December 1941, at the start of the US' involvement in World War II. Acting Secretary of the Navy Thomas Modly announced the name on 24 December 2019, in a press release. Arizona was authorized for construction on 2 December 2019. 

The keel laying ceremony took place 7 December 2022 at the Quonset Point Facility of General Dynamics Electric Boat in North Kingston, RI. The sponsor for Arizona is Nikki Stratton, the granddaughter of Donald Stratton, a Seaman First Class aboard the battleship USS Arizona during the attack and survived, he died in February 2020 at the age of 97.

References

 

 

Virginia-class submarines
Submarines of the United States Navy